{{Infobox rail line
|box_width=auto
|name=Tauern Railway
|other_name=
|native_name=Tauernbahn
|native_name_lang=de
|color=
|logo=
|image=Railjet 793 bei Bad Hofgastein.jpg 
|image_width= 320px
|caption=Railjet 793 near Bad Hofgastein, Salzburg
|type=Mountain railwayInter-city rail
|system=
|status=Operational
|locale=Salzburg, Carinthia
|start=Schwarzach-St. Veit
|end=Spittal-Millstättersee
|stations=21
|open=Stages between 1905–1909
|owner=Austrian Federal Railways
|operator=Austrian Federal Railways
|stock=
|linelength=
|tracks=Double track* Schwarzach-St. V. – Loifarn-Süd (5.4 km)* turnout Loifarn 1 – turnout Bad Hofg. 1 (13.3 km)* Angertal – turnout Angertal 1 (2.3 km)* Böckstein – Spittal-Millstättersee (46.5 km)Single track
|gauge=
|minradius=
|routenumber=220
|linenumber=222 01
|electrification=15 kV/16.7 Hz AC Overhead line 
|speed=
|elevation=
|maxincline=3.0 %
|website=
|map_state=
|map = {{Routemap
|inline = 1|title = no|footnote=Source: Austrian railway atlas
|map =
~~km~~ ~~ ~~elev
STR~~ ~~ ~~Salzburg-Tyrol Railway from Salzburg
\BHF\~~0.000~~Schwarzach-St. Veit
\ABZgr\~~ ~~ ~~Salzburg-Tyrol Railway to Wörgl
BS2+l\eBS2+r
STR\exTUNNEL1~~ ~~ ~~Untersberg Tunnel (270 m)
TUNNEL1\exSTR~~ ~~ ~~Kenlach Tunnel (314 m)
TUNNEL1\exSTR~~ ~~ ~~Birgl Tunnel (960 m)
BS2l\eBS2r
\DST\~~5.431~~Loifarn~~(since 2006 no passenger services)
\BST\~~6.800~~Loifarn-Süd
\KMW\~~~~ ~~break in kilometrage (-319 m)
\TUNNEL1\~~ ~~ ~~Lower Klamm Tunnel (739.38 m)
\TUNNEL1\~~ ~~ ~~Oberer Klamm Tunnel (744.01 m)
\BST\~~~~ ~~Loifarn 1  turnout (break in kilometrage (-45 m))
\eHST\~~ ~~Klammstein~~( closed 01.06.1991)
\hKRZWae\~~ ~~ ~~Gasteiner Ache
\BHF\~~14.313~~Dorfgastein
\BHF\~~19.281~~Bad Hofgastein
\eHST\~~22.360~~Bad Hofgastein stop
\BST\~~22.570~~ ~~Bad Hofgastein 1 turnout
eBS2+l\BS2+r
exhKRZWae\hKRZWae~~ ~~ ~~Angerschlucht Bridge
exSTR\STR~~ ~~ ~~New bridge (138 m)eBS2l\BS2r
\DST\~~25.390~~Angertal~~since 2006 no passenger services\BST\~~27.662~~ ~~turnout Angertal 1
\KMW\~~~~ ~~break in kilometrage (-60 m)
\BHF\~~30.078~~Bad Gastein
\hKRZWae\~~ ~~ ~~Nassfelder Ache
\hKRZWae\~~ ~~ ~~Anlaufbach
\BHF\~~34.183~~Böckstein 
\KMW\~~~~ ~~break in kilometrage (-4 m)
\tSTRa\~~34.816~~ ~~Tauern Tunnel (8370 m)
\tSTRe\~~43.187~~
\eHST\~~ ~~Tauern Tunnel~~( closed 2001)
\BST\~~43.347~~Mallnitz-Hintertal
\hKRZWae\~~ ~~ ~~Seebach
\BST\~~45.110~~Mallnitz-Nord
\BHF\~~45.932~~Mallnitz-Obervellach formerly Mallnitz
\KMW\~~~~ ~~break in kilometrage (-862 m)
exSTR+l\eABZgr\
exTUNNEL1\STR\~~ ~~ ~~Dösen Tunnel (891.19 m)
exSTR\tSTRa\~~47.635~~ ~~Kaponig Tunnel (5096 m)
exSTR\tÜST\~~51.738~~ Mallnitz-Obervellach crossover 2
exBHF\tSTR\~~51.767~~Kaponig formerly Obervellach~~ closed 1999
exSTR\tSTRe\~~52.731~~
exTUNNEL1\STR\~~ ~~ ~~Upper Kaponig Tunnel (236.05 m)
exSTRl\eKRZ\exSTR+r~~ ~~ ~~Rescue gallery
\TUNNEL1\exSTR~~ ~~ ~~Ochenig Tunnel (690 m)
\STR\exTUNNEL1~~ ~~ ~~Lower Kaponig Tunnel (789.22 m)
\STR\exTUNNEL1~~ ~~ ~~Upper Lindisch Tunnel (260 m)
\hSTRae\exSTR~~ ~~ ~~Lindischgraben Bridge (283 m)
\STR\exTUNNEL1~~ ~~ ~~Lower Lindisch Tunnel (379 m)
\HST\exSTR~~55.819~~Oberfalkenstein
\STR\exTUNNEL1~~ ~~ ~~Leutschach Tunnel (247 m)
\STR\exTUNNEL1~~ ~~ ~~Falkenstein Tunnel (67 m)
\hKRZWae\exSTR~~ ~~ ~~Falkenstein Bridge (396 m)
\STR\exTUNNEL1~~ ~~ ~~Gratschach Tunnel (357 m)
\hKRZWae\exSTR~~ ~~ ~~Pfaffenberg Bridge (377 m)
\STR\exTUNNEL1~~ ~~ ~~Pfaffenberg Tunnel (499 m)
\STR\exTUNNEL1~~ ~~ ~~Zwengenberg Tunnel (391 m)
\eABZg+l\exSTRr
\KMW\~~~~ ~~break in kilometrage (-358 m)
\BHF\~~58.417~~Penk
\hKRZWae\~~ ~~ ~~Mölltheuergraben Bridge (94 m)
\hKRZWae\~~ ~~ ~~Litzelsdorfergraben Bridge (185 m)
\hKRZWae\~~ ~~ ~~Rieckenbach Bridge (190 m)
\BHF\~~64.790~~Kolbnitz
\ÜST\~~69.124~~ Kolbnitz crossover 2
\HST\~~69.360~~Mühldorf-Möllbrücke
\eBHF\~~69.428~~Bahnhof Mühldorf-Möllbrücke
\STR\~~ ~~ ~~replaced by Kolbnitz crossover 2
\BHF\~~72.904~~Pusarnitz
\BST\~~74.000~~Pusarnitz-Süd
\ABZg+r\~~74.394~~ Line 407 01 turnout
\STR\~~ ~~ ~~Drava Valley Railway from Innichen
\BHF\~~80.897~~Spittal-Millstättersee
\STR\~~ ~~ ~~Drava Valley Railway to Villach and Maribor
~~km~~
}}
}}
The Tauern Railway is an Austrian railway line between  Schwarzach-Sankt Veit in the state of Salzburg and Spittal an der Drau in Carinthia. It is part of one of the most important north-south trunk routes (Magistrale) in Europe and also carries tourist traffic for the Gastein Valley. It is one of the highest standard gauge railways in Europe and the third highest in Austria.

History
Since the opening of the Suez Canal in 1869, the Cisleithanian government of Austria-Hungary had urged for a direct connection of the restored main Austrian seaport at Trieste with the Bohemian coalfields and iron works in the northern parts of the Monarchy. After lengthy discussions, the building of the Tauernbahn was set up as a part of the larger "New Alpine Railways" investment project, pushed by the newly established k.k. Railway Ministry under Heinrich von Wittek from 1901 onwards. 

Construction was executed by the public Imperial Royal Austrian State Railways to achieve an alternative route bypassing the Southern Railway line from Vienna to Trieste via the Semmering railway operated by the private Austrian Southern Railway company. Other sections built in the course of this infrastructure investment were the Karawanks Railway from Villach to Jesenice, continued by the Bohinj Railway (Wocheiner Bahn) leading through the Julian Alps to Trieste, as well as the railway line from the city of Linz across the Pyhrn Pass to the Selzthal rail hub.

Construction of the Tauern Tunnel began on 24 June 1901, the northern ramp from Schwarzach-St. Veit was built from 1902 onwards. Significant construction cost overruns triggered fierce debates in the Austrian Imperial Council, nevertheless on 20 September 1905 the first section of the line up to Bad Gastein station was ceremonially opened by Emperor Franz Joseph I, Minister-President Paul Gautsch von Frankenthurn, and Archbishop Cardinal Johannes Katschthaler. The southern ramp down to Spittal an der Drau was erected from 1906 under the supervision of the Viennese engineer and entrepreneur Wilhelm Carl Gustav von Doderer, father of the writer Heimito von Doderer. The railway line was completed in 1909 and inaugurated by the emperor at Spittal station on 5 July.

The tunnel itself had been built double-track, the northern and southern sections only single-track. In 1999 the Obervellach station was finally abandoned and relocated to Mallnitz. In 1933-35 the Tauern Railway line was completely electrified. From 1969 onwards further sections were restored to double track including several new passages, viaducts and straightenings to cope with the high traffic load and to allow higher travelling speeds. The southern ramp down to Pusarnitz was completed double-track in 2009, while parts of the former track bed between Mallnitz and Obervellach were turned into a hiking trail. A new double-track bridge in the Gastein valley was put into operation in 2016.

Rail service

Since 1920 car shuttle trains (Tauernschleuse) through the Tauern Tunnel ply between the stations of Bad Gastein-Böckstein and Mallnitz. Up to World War II, the Tauern Railway mainly served Austrian domestic rail service, with a few links to Yugoslavia (Zagreb, Belgrade, and the Adriatic coast). After the war, the number of international train services to Southeast Europe increased as the main route via Bratislava and Budapest was blocked by the Iron Curtain. From 1951 to 1988 the Tauern-Express ran from Ostend to Yugoslavia, including through coaches to Athens and Istanbul, frequently used by migrant workers (Gastarbeiter'') in West Germany.

Long-distance services have decreased since the Yugoslav Wars in the 1990s, and by competition from expanded road connections and cheaper flights. Today the Tauern Railway provides EuroCity service to Zagreb and ÖBB InterCity connections link Salzburg with Klagenfurt, partially served by Railjet trains.

See also
Rail transport in Austria
Austrian Federal Railways

Footnotes

Sources

External links 
 Departure times
 Tauern Railway Museum in Schwarzach im Pongau
 Buchtipp: 100 Jahre Tauernbahn
 Opening of the North Ramp of the Tauern Railway by Franz Joseph I  20 September 1905
  Tauern Railway – Austria’s Modern Alpine Railway / Buchtipp
 The Tauern Railway - www.tauernbahn.at
 of Construction of the Tauern Railway
 Fotoalbum: TAUERNBAHN – Railway photographs of the Tauern Railway (www.eisenbahn-in-oesterreich.at)

Railway lines in Austria
Ankogel Group
Goldberg Group